Karuna is a 1966 Indian Malayalam-language film, directed and produced by K. Thankappan. The film stars Devika Madhu, Adoor Bhasi, Thikkurissy Sukumaran Nair and Sankaradi. The film had musical score by G. Devarajan.

Cast
Madhu
Adoor Bhasi
Thikkurissy Sukumaran Nair
Sankaradi
Devika
K. P. Ummer
T. K. Balachandran
Vijaya Rani
Renuka

Soundtrack
The music was composed by G. Devarajan and the lyrics were written by Kumaranasan and O. N. V. Kurup.

References

External links
 

1966 films
1960s Malayalam-language films